Hemachandra Tukaram "Bal" Dani  (24 May 1933, Dudhani, Maharashtra – 19 December 1999, Nashik, Maharashtra) was an Indian Test cricketer.

Bal Dani was predominantly a right-handed batsman. He could also bowl medium pace and later turned to off and leg breaks. His only Test match was against Pakistan in 1952/53. India won the game losing only four wickets, and Dani did not get a chance to bat and took a single wicket off his 10 overs. Only 19 at the time, his opening partner was the 41-year-old Lala Amarnath. He toured Pakistan in 1954/55 without appearing in a Test match.

He did his schooling at Rungta High School, Nashik. Contemporary cricketer Bapu Nadkarni also attended the same school. He held a B.A. (Hons) degree. His early first class career was with Maharashtra but he moved to Services after joining the Indian Air Force in 1956. He rose to become an Air Commodore and retired in 1987.

He hit 17 centuries and took 200 wickets in his career. He captained Services for several years. He played most of his good cricket well after his Test career. After he retired, he was a national selector from 1968 to 1975. He was the manager, selector and coach of Maharashtra's Ranji Trophy side between 1989 and 1997. He was involved with the charity organisation Sneha Seva in Pune.

See also
One Test Wonder

References
 Christopher Martin-Jenkins, The Complete Who's Who of Test Cricketers
 Dani's obituary
 Obituary in Pioneer

External links
 Cricinfo profile
 CricketArchive profile

India Test cricketers
Indian cricketers
Maharashtra cricketers
Services cricketers
Indian Universities cricketers
Mumbai cricketers
North Zone cricketers
West Zone cricketers
1999 deaths
1933 births
Cricketers from Maharashtra
Indian cricket coaches
Indian cricket administrators